Baron Dinorben, of Kinmel Hall in the County of Denbigh, was a title in the Peerage of the United Kingdom. It was created on 10 September 1831 for William Hughes, the long-standing Whig Member of Parliament for Wallingford. He was succeeded by his younger and only surviving son, the second Baron. On his early death on 6 October 1852, only eight months after the death of his father, the barony became extinct.

Barons Dinorben (1831)
 
William Lewis Hughes, 1st Baron Dinorben (1767–1852)
William Lewis Hughes, 2nd Baron Dinorben (1821–1852)

References

David Beamish's Peerage Page
History of the Hughes family and the Kinmel estate

Extinct baronies in the Peerage of the United Kingdom
Noble titles created in 1831
Noble titles created for UK MPs